Dr. Sears may refer to:

 Robert Sears (physician)
 William Sears (physician)